The Ready Set (Jordan Witzigreuter) is an American electropop artist who has released 5 albums and 14 singles. His first single, "Love Like Woe" peaked at number 27 on Billboard Hot 100 and is certified platinum in the US. His major album, I'm Alive, I'm Dreaming reached number 3 on the Heatseekers Albums chart. His Feel Good Now EP debuted on the Billboard 200 at number 179. "Give Me Your Hand (Best Song Ever)" is his first single off his second major album, The Bad & the Better which peaked at number 30 on the Mainstream Top 40. The album peaked at number 75 on the Billboard 200. I Will Be Nothing Without Your Love is his third major album and reached the Independent Albums chart at number 24. As of 2019, Witzigreuter goes under the name of Onlychild.

Albums

Studio albums

Extended plays

The Ready Set

Onlychild

Singles

The Ready Set

Lead singles

Promotional singles

Other Charted Songs

As featured artist

Onlychild

Singles

Other appearances

Songwriting credits

Music videos

Notes

References

Discographies of American artists